Boston Uprising is an American professional Overwatch esports team based in Boston, Massachusetts. The team competes in the Overwatch League (OWL) as a member of the league's West region. Founded in 2017, Boston is one of the league's twelve founding teams. The team is owned by Robert Kraft of the Kraft Group, who also owns the National Football League's New England Patriots and Uprising Academy, an academy team for the Uprising that compete in Overwatch Contenders.

Boston became the first team in the history of the Overwatch League to go undefeated during a regular season stage, after going  in Stage 3 of the 2018 season. After reaching the League playoffs and finishing fifth in the final season standings in the 2018 season, the organization has failed to return to the playoffs.

Franchise history 
On July 12, 2017, Blizzard Entertainment officially announced that the Kraft Group had acquired the Boston-based franchise of the Overwatch League. On the decision to purchase the Esports franchise, Robert Kraft said in a statement, "We have been exploring the esports market for a number of years and have been waiting for the right opportunity to enter. The incredible global success of Overwatch since its launch, coupled with the League's meticulous focus on a structure and strategy that clearly represents the future of esports made this the obvious entry point for the Kraft Group." In August 2017, the Kraft Group announced Chris "HuK" Loranger would be serving as and president of gaming for the franchise, where he would "oversee player acquisition, training, and daily operations". On October 25, 2017, the Uprising announced their full roster, consisting of eight players.

Early years: 2018–present 
Boston Uprising's first regular season OWL match was a 1–3 loss to the New York Excelsior on January 11, 2018. Boston found their franchise's first-ever regular season win a day later, after defeating the Florida Mayhem, 4–0. In April 2018, Uprising player Jonathan "DreamKazper" Sanchez was indefinitely suspended from the Overwatch League following allegations of sexual misconduct involving a minor. Shortly after, on April 9, Boston Uprising terminated his contract. Following, Kwon "Striker" Nam-joo took over DreamKazper's starting position – a move that ultimately benefited the team. Throughout Stage 3 of the season, the Striker-led Uprising did not lose a single match, going 10–0, to become the first team to go undefeated in a stage. Boston reached the Stage 3 finals; however, they lost the finals match against the New York Excelsior. Prior to the start of Stage 4, Overwatch underwent a balancing update, as well as the introduction of a new hero, which would significantly reduced Striker's effectiveness. Additionally, head coach Park "Crusty" Dae-hee left the team to join the San Francisco Shock. The Uprising finished the regular season in third place with a 26–14 record. The Uprising's postseason came to a quick end, as they were defeated in the quarterfinals by the Philadelphia Fusion, two series to one.

Boston went through major roster changes prior to the 2019 season. Among other signings, the team picked up tank player Cameron "Fusions" Bosworth, who had recently performed well at the 2018 Overwatch World Cup. Additionally, the Uprising transferred Striker to the San Francisco Shock and tank Noh "Gamsu" Young-jin to the Shanghai Dragons. Throughout the entire 2019 season, the Uprising went without a head coach. Through the first half of the season, the Uprising posted a middling 7–7 record. However, in the second half of the season, they only picked up a single win, finishing regular season in 19th place with an 8–20 record.

Following the 2019 season, the Uprising picked up former Florida Mayhem coach Vytis "Mineral" Lasaitis as their new head coach, marking the first time that the organization had a head coach in 16 months. The team released all but three of their players: Fusion, tank Park "Axxiom" Min-sub, and damage player Kelsey "Colourhex" Birse. Boston signed mostly rookies to their squad, leaving many analysts predicting them to finish near the bottom of the standings. Throughout the season, Boston parted ways with four players, and tank player Park "Axxiom" Min-seob became inactive due to medical reasons. The instability of the roster proved too much for the team to overcome, as Boston ended the season with a league-worst 2–19 record and found no success in any of the league's midseason tournaments or in the postseason play-in tournament.

Prior to the 2021 season, the Uprising signed Kim "Lori" Seung-hyun as their new head coach, while Mineral took on a management position within the organization. The team retained four of the players from the previous season, including Colourhex, Fusions, support Seo "Myunb0ng" Sang-min, and tank Leyton "Punk" Gilchrist, while signings a mixture of veterans and rookies. The Boston Uprising competed in the SteelSeries Invitational, coming in second place after losing to the Los Angeles Gladiators 0-3. Behind a stable roster throughout the season, Boston finished in 15th place with a 7–9 record, marking their best regular season winning percentage since 2018. The team qualified for the Western region play-in tournament; however, they lost in the first round to the Toronto Defiant, failing to reach the season playoffs.

In the following offseason, the Uprising parted ways with six players, including Colourhex, Myunb0ng, and Fusions, who retired from professional Overwatch altogether. Boston signed and picked up several new players; most notably Striker was signed back to the team after he retired in the middle of 2021 season. However, three weeks into the season, Striker was dropped from the team.

Team identity 
On October 25, 2017, the franchise name was revealed as the Boston Uprising; the name "Uprising" was selected in honor of Boston's resilient forefathers and their legacy in the American Revolution which laid the foundation of the city. They also unveiled the team's logo and blue-yellow-black color scheme, with the latter drawing inspiration from the colors found in Boston's city flag. The logo is a shield surrounding a bold "B"—a letter that is synonymous with the city of Boston.

Sponsors 
In late April 2018, the team revealed their first partnership, a shaving product sponsor, with Boston-based Gillette. The deal included a number of digital and social content initiatives, as well as having the Gillette logo featured on the team's practice jerseys and training facility.

On October 31, 2018, the team added Bose as a sponsor, joining other Kraft-owned sports franchises and Boston teams supported by the Boston-based audio company.

Personnel

Current roster

Head coaches

Awards and records

Seasons overview

Individual accomplishments 
All-Star Game selections
Gamsu (Noh Young-jin) – 2018
Neko (Park Se-hyun) – 2018
Striker (Gwon Nam-ju) – 2018
Fusions (Cameron Bosworth) – 2019
Myunbong (Seo Sang-min) – 2020

Academy team 

On February 19, 2018, the Uprising announced a partnership with Toronto Esports Club's Overwatch Contenders team. In November 2018, following the unveiling of the Toronto Defiant in the Overwatch League, the league informed the Uprising they needed to change their name. Rather than change their name, the Toronto Esports team decided to pull out of Contenders completely, citing not only issues with the naming request but new changes in the Contenders format. According to their president Ryan Pallet, the organization was given a six-week notice to change their name. The Kraft organization still owns the rights to the players, coaches and the Contenders slot held by the team, which is officially competing under the name "Uprising Academy."

References

External links 

 

 
2017 establishments in Massachusetts
Esports teams based in the United States
Esports teams established in 2017
Overwatch League teams
Uprising